RK Metaloplastika is a Serbian handball club based in Šabac. They compete in the Serbian Handball Super League.

History
The club itself dates back to 1958. They initially competed under the name Partizan. In 1970, the club changed its name to Metaloplastika after being taken over by the industrial company of the same name. They earned promotion to the Yugoslav Championship in 1974. The club won its first trophy, the Yugoslav Cup, in the 1979–80 season, securing a spot in European competitions for the first time ever. They subsequently reached the Cup Winners' Cup semi-finals in their debut international appearance. The 1980s saw the club became champions of Yugoslavia a record seven times in a row, commencing from the 1981–82 season. They also established themselves as a dominant force in European club handball, making three straight European Cup finals appearances. After losing the 1984 final, the club won back-to-back titles in 1985 and 1986 the squad was nicknamed "the Šabac Aliens" by the media. In the 2013–14 season, the club reached the EHF Challenge Cup final. They played just one tie due to the severe flooding in Serbia, losing away to IK Sävehof in Sweden. In the 2015–16 season, the club won the Serbian Cup, ending a run of 28 years without a trophy. In the 2021–2022 season, the club won the Serbian Cup again.

Crest, colours, supporters

Naming history

Club crest

Team

Current squad 
Squad for the 2022–23 season

Technical staff
 Head Coach:  Vladan Matić

Transfers

Transfers for the 2022–23 season

Joining 
  Milan Jovanović (LB) from  Fenix Toulouse
  Branko Kankaraš (LP) from  RK Crvena Zvezda
  Kosta Petrović (LP) from  Stal Mielec
  Milija Papović (RW)
  Božidar Simić (CB)
  Milan Dakić (CB)
  Aljoša Damjanović (CB)

Leaving 
  Vukašin Antonijević (CB) to  RK Celje
  Savo Mešter (CB) to  Steaua București
  Nikola Zorić (GK) to  S.L. Benfica
  Saša Terzić (RW) to  RK Jugović
  Strahinja Novaković (RW)
  Nenad Cvijanović (LP) 
  Vuk Milenković (LP)

Previous squads

Honours

Domestic
Yugoslav League
 1981–82, 1982–83, 1983–84, 1984–85, 1985–86, 1986–87, 1987–88
Yugoslav Cup / Serbian Cup
 1979–80, 1982–83, 1983–84, 1985–86 / 2015–16, 2021-22

European
European Cup
 1984–85, 1985–86

 Double
 1982–83, 1983–84, 1985–86

 Triple
 1985–86

European record

European Cup and Champions League

EHF ranking

Former club members

Notable former players

  Darko Arsić (2005–2016, 2018, 2021–)
  Mirko Bašić (1980–1989)
  Tettey Banfro (1987–1991)
  Milan Bomaštar (2016–2021)
  Jovica Cvetković (1984–1985)
  Zoran Đorđić (1986–1992)
  Miloš Dragaš (2010–2012, 2013–2014)
  Milutin Dragićević (2002–2005, 2014–2017)
  Nebojša Golić (1997–1999)
  Đorđe Golubović (2016)
  Nikola Isailović (2003–2009)
  Mile Isaković (1973–1986, 1987–1988)
  Milan Jovanović (2023–)
  Nedeljko Jovanović (1992–1993)
  Branko Kankaraš (2013–2014, 2023–)
  Slobodan Kuzmanovski (–1989)
  Dejan Lukić (–1986)
  Filip Marjanović (2009–2014)
  Vladan Matić (1987–1993)
  Muhamed Memić (1979–1980)
  Milan Milić (2018–2020)
  Žikica Milosavljević (2013–2014)
  Jasmin Mrkonja (1983–1987)
  Nemanja Obradović (2013–2015)
  Zlatko Portner (1982–1989)
  Dane Šijan (1991–1998)
  Nebojša Stojinović (1985–1999)
  Predrag Vejin (2010–2013)
  Vukašin Vorkapić (2016–2021)
  Veselin Vujović (1979–1988)
  Veselin Vuković (1975–1986)
  Sasa Zivoulovic (1996–1998)
  Zoran Mikulić (1986–1990)
  Sergo Datukashvili (2000, 2015–2016)
  Goran Đukanović (2002–2003)
  Ratko Đurković (1995–1997)
  Božidar Leković (2013–2014)

Former coaches

References

External links
 
 

Metaloplastika
Handball clubs established in 1958
1958 establishments in Yugoslavia
Sport in Šabac